Green Line is a commuter coach brand in the Home counties of England. The trademark is owned by Arriva, with services operated by Arriva Shires & Essex and Reading Buses.

Green Line had its origin in the network of coach services established by the London General Omnibus Company (LGOC) in the 1920s and 1930s, being absorbed into the London Passenger Transport Board in 1933. After World War II, the network was part of London Transport Executive/London Transport Board, and from 1970 to 1986 was operated by London Country Bus Services.

History

Early history
Green Line Coaches Limited was formed on 9 July 1930 by the LGOC, which from 1927 had built up a network of coach services from London to towns up to 30 miles away, comprising 60 vehicles on eight routes. These services were largely started in response to the emergence of numerous small independent operators, often running single routes. As well as express services operated by LGOC, some were run by subsidiary companies such as East Surrey Traction & Autocar Services and some on LGOC's behalf by the National Omnibus & Transport Company. The Green Line livery and fleetname was rolled out across the existing express services, differentiating these from LGOC's red service buses.

New services quickly followed, with the number of routes increasing to 27 by October 1931 and the number of coaches to 275. Green Line also began to acquire some of its independent competitors. The laying over of coaches in central London began to create congestion, so, to relieve this, some routes were linked to form cross-London services, and a short-lived coach station was opened in Poland Street, Soho at the end of 1930.

On 1 July 1933, Green Line passed to the new London Passenger Transport Board and competing services within the London Passenger Transport Area were absorbed into the network. Various vehicles of numerous different types were inherited, and much effort was made in replacing these with a standardised fleet of vehicles from late 1936. Poland Street coach station was closed, and almost all routes were linked to run across London.

Post-war era
Services were suspended during World War II, resuming in February 1946. More services were added, and the routes were given numbers in the 700 series. Ridership increased to a peak of 36 million passenger journeys a year between 1957 and 1960. In 1962, AEC Routemaster double-deck coaches were introduced on some routes, notably route 721 which ran every 12 minutes at peak times, and route 704 conveying tourists to Windsor and Royal Tunbridge Wells. Orbital coach routes commenced:
 724 from High Wycombe around the north of London to Romford
 725 from Windsor around the south of London to Gravesend
 727 from Crawley around the west of London to Luton

In 1970, London Transport became the responsibility of the Greater London Council, so control of Green Line was passed from London Transport to London Country Bus Services, part of the state-owned National Bus Company. Patronage was declining, partly as a result of increasing car use and quicker parallel rail services, and the last cross-London routes ceased in 1979.

The Transport Act 1980 deregulated coach services, and Green Line expanded services beyond its traditional area, to Cambridge (route 797), Oxford (routes 290 and 790, in conjunction with the Oxford Bus Company), Northampton and Brighton. New airport services also commenced:
 747 Heathrow Airport to Gatwick Airport
 757 Green Line Coach Station to Luton Airport
 767 Green Line Coach Station to Heathrow Airport
 777 Green Line Coach Station to Gatwick Airport

By this time, the orbital services 724 and 726 (a variant of the 725) had been revised to serve Heathrow. Green Line also became a National Express operator.

Privatisation
In 1986, London Country was divided into four operating companies to prepare for privatisation. They were sold separately, and ownership of the Green Line network became fragmented, with only a few routes surviving. The airport services passed to Jetlink and are now operated by National Express.

The orbital route 726 was taken over by London Regional Transport in a reduced form and in April 2005 was renumbered London Buses route X26. By the mid-1990s, Arriva had become the owner of most of the London Country successor companies and became the owner of the Green Line brand. It licensed the brand to other operators: First Berkshire & The Thames Valley (700, 701 and 702), New Enterprise Coaches (routes 781 and 784 from 2005 to 2009) and Stephensons of Essex (routes X1 and X10 from 2002 until 2008).

Following closure of its Bracknell depot in 2015, First Berkshire services were revised and routes 700 and 701 were discontinued. Reading Buses took over operation of route 702 on 24 December 2017. On 8 May 2018, the 702 was withdrawn between Legoland Windsor and Bracknell. On the same day, route 703 was introduced under the Green Line brand, running between Heathrow Terminal 5 and Bracknell, replacing the withdrawn section.

In April 2020, Arriva Shires & Essex was scheduled to commence operating a new Green Line route 720 from Stansted Airport to Liverpool Street, but was delayed due to the COVID-19 pandemic.

On 4 December 2021, Route 758, operated by Arriva Shires & Essex, was withdrawn, citing long-term low passenger numbers made worse by the COVID-19 pandemic.

Current services
Reading Buses:
702: Legoland, Windsor and Slough to Green Line Coach Station (extended from Legoland to Bracknell and Reading at peak times)
703: Bracknell, Legoland, Windsor and Slough to Heathrow Terminal 5

Arriva Shires & Essex:
724: Heathrow Airport to Harlow via St Albans

755/757: Luton and Luton Airport to Green Line Coach Station

References

External links

Arriva Group bus operators in England
Bus transport brands
Coach operators in England
1930 establishments in England